Wanjala is a surname. Notable people with the surname include: 

Doris Wanjala (1966–2007), Kenyan volleyball player
Salome Wanjala (born 1985), Kenyan volleyball player
Smokin Wanjala, Kenyan lawyer and associate justice of the Supreme Court of Kenya
Tecla Namachanja Wanjala (born 1962), Kenyan conflict resolution, post-conflict rehabilitation, and development worker